Microdon abstrusus (Thompson, 1981), the hidden ant fly, is a rare and local species of syrphid fly observed in central Pennsylvania. Hoverflies can remain nearly motionless in flight. The adults are also known as flower flies for they are commonly found on flowers though microdon species are seldom seen around flowers. Larvae have been noted in Formica exsectoides ant nests.

References

Diptera of North America
Hoverflies of North America
Microdontinae
Insects described in 1981